Andy Figaroa (born April 10, 1983) is an Aruban football player. He has appeared for the Aruba national team twice in 2004 and 2008.

National team statistics

References

1983 births
Living people
Aruban footballers
Association football defenders
SV Deportivo Nacional players
Aruba international footballers